Fleming Point is a rocky promontory in the U.S. state of California. It is situated in Albany, on the eastern shore of San Francisco Bay. Albany Bulb is an extension of the point, having been formed in the 1960s from construction debris.

History
Fleming Point is named after John T. Fleming who lived in the area in 1853, having bought the land from Jose Domingo Peralta. In the 19th century, it was the site of the Giant Powder Company and Judson Dynamite and Powder Company. The Giant plant suffered two major accidental explosions, one in 1880 and another in 1892.  Explosives plants dominated the Albany waterfront until 1905 when they were replaced with somewhat less dangerous chemical factories.  By the first decade of the 20th century, it was used by residents of Berkeley as a garbage dump, one of the reasons the City of Albany decided to incorporate in 1908.  It is currently the site of Golden Gate Fields, which held its first meet on February 1, 1941.

Geology
Near Fleming Point, south of Point Richmond, the waters of the bay have cut low cliffs in which even alternations of sandstone and shale are observable. In some instances the black shale shows a decided lenticular character. Some lenses are fifteen to twenty feet long and a foot or so thick in the central part.

References

Bibliography

Peninsulas of California
Albany, California
Landforms of Alameda County, California